Venturia is a genus of fungi in the family Venturiaceae. First identified in 1882, species in the genus are plant pathogens. Venturia is widespread and the genus contains an estimated 58 species, or 130 species. Anamorphs were historically represented in the genus Fusicladium.

The genus was circumscribed by Pier Andrea Saccardo in Syll. Fung. vol.1 on page 586 in 1882.

The genus name of Venturia is in honour of Carlo Antonio Maria Venturi (1805–1864), who was an Italian mycologist.

Species
As accepted by Species Fungorum;

Venturia acerina 
Venturia aceris 
Venturia achilleae 
Venturia adusta 
Venturia aesculi 
Venturia alaskensis 
Venturia allii 
Venturia alnea 
Venturia anemones 
Venturia antherici 
Venturia asperata 
Venturia atriseda 
Venturia aucupariae 
Venturia austrogermanica 
Venturia betulina 
Venturia bistortae 
Venturia borealis 
Venturia borgiana 
Venturia braunii 
Venturia canadensis 
Venturia carpophila 
Venturia castaneae 
Venturia catenospora 
Venturia centaureae 
Venturia cephalariae 
Venturia cerasi 
Venturia chamaemori 
Venturia chamaepeuces 
Venturia chartae 
Venturia chinensis 
Venturia chlorospora 
Venturia chrysanthemi 
Venturia comari 
Venturia convolvulorum 
Venturia coprosmae 
Venturia corni 
Venturia corralensis 
Venturia crataegi 
Venturia deutziae 
Venturia ditricha 
Venturia effusa 
Venturia elaeidis 
Venturia elasticae 
Venturia emergens 
Venturia ephedrae 
Venturia epilobii 
Venturia eres 
Venturia euchaeta 
Venturia fagi 
Venturia frangulae 
Venturia fuliginosa 
Venturia geranii 
Venturia glacialis 
Venturia haglundii 
Venturia hariotiana 
Venturia helvetica 
Venturia inaequalis 
Venturia inopina 
Venturia integra 
Venturia iridis 
Venturia juncaginearum 
Venturia kunzei 
Venturia laneae 
Venturia liriodendri 
Venturia litseae 
Venturia lonicerae 
Venturia lycopodii 
Venturia macularis 
Venturia maculicola 
Venturia maculiformis 
Venturia major 
Venturia mandshurica 
Venturia martianoffiana 
Venturia massalongoi 
Venturia minuta 
Venturia minutissima 
Venturia missionum 
Venturia moreletii 
Venturia muelleri 
Venturia nashicola 
Venturia naumoviella 
Venturia nebulosa 
Venturia nitida 
Venturia oleaginea 
Venturia orbicularis 
Venturia orbiculata 
Venturia palustris 
Venturia paralias 
Venturia peltigericola 
Venturia phaeosepta 
Venturia phillyreae 
Venturia polygoni-vivipari 
Venturia populina 
Venturia potentillae 
Venturia pruni 
Venturia pruni-cerasi 
Venturia pyrina 
Venturia radiosa 
Venturia rhamni 
Venturia ribis 
Venturia rubicola 
Venturia rumicis 
Venturia saliciperda 
Venturia spiraeicola 
Venturia stevensii 
Venturia subcutanea 
[[Ventruia submersa  
Venturia syringae 
Venturia syringina 
Venturia thwaitesii 
Venturia tomentosae 
Venturia tremulae 
Venturia tucumanensis 
Venturia uliginosi 
Venturia ulmi 
Venturia usteriana 
[[Venturia variisetosa  
Venturia viennotii 
Venturia weiriana

Former species
As accepted by Species Fungorum;

 V. aggregata  = Antennularia aggregata, Metacapnodiaceae
 V. alchemillae  = Coleroa alchemillae
 [V. alpina  = Protoventuria alpina, Metacapnodiaceae
 V. alpina  = Gibbera niesslii
 V. andicola  = Niesslia andicola, Niessliaceae
 V. antarctica  = Niesslia antarctica, Niessliaceae
 V. antherici var. gentianae  = Venturia antherici
 V. applanata  = Chaetothyrina applanata, Micropeltidaceae
 V. asterinoides  = Chaetothyrina asterinoides, Micropeltidaceae
 V. asteromorpha  = Venturia epilobii
 V. atramentaria  = Gibbera conferta
 V. barbula  = Trichosphaeria barbula, Trichosphaeriaceae
 V. barriae  = Fagicola fagi
 V. bellotae  = Niesslia bellotae, Niessliaceae
 V. bryophila  = Epibryon bryophilum, Epibryaceae
 V. cassandrae  = Gibbera cassandrae
 V. caulicola  = Coleroa caulicola
 V. chaetomium  = Niesslia exosporioides, Niessliaceae
 V. chlorospora f. pruni-cerasi  = Venturia pruni-cerasi
 V. chlorospora var. canescens  = Venturia chlorospora
 V. chlorospora var. microspora  = Venturia chlorospora
 V. chlorospora var. pyri  = Venturia chlorospora
 V. chlorospora var. salicis-vitellinae  = Venturia chlorospora
 V. chlorospora var. sorbi-aucupariae  = Venturia chlorospora
 V. cinereofusca  = Pezicula cinereofusca, Dermateaceae
 V. circinans  = Coleroa circinans
 V. compacta  = Pyrenobotrys compactus
 V. concinna  = Coleroa concinna
 V. confertissima  = Venturia geranii
 V. cucumerina  = Plectosphaerella cucumerina, Plectosphaerellaceae
 V. cupressina  = Asterinella cupressina, Microthyriaceae
 V. cupulata  = Johansonia cupulata, Johansoniaceae
 V. curviseta  = Antennularia curviseta, Metacapnodiaceae
 V. dickiei  = Metacoleroa dickiei
 V. ditricha f. piri  = Venturia ditricha
 V. echinata  = Acantharia echinata
 V. elegantula  = Gibbera elegantula
 V. enteleae  = Mycosphaerella enteleae, Mycosphaerellaceae
 V. epilobiana  = Venturia maculiformis
 V. erysiphoides  = Niesslia erysiphoides, Niessliaceae
 V. exosporioides  = Niesslia exosporioides, Niessliaceae
 V. fimbriata  = Wentiomyces fimbriatus, Pseudoperisporiaceae
 V. fimiseda  = Antennularia fimiseda, Metacapnodiaceae
 V. formosa  = Johansonia formosa, Johansoniaceae
 V. fraxini  = Fraxinicola fraxini
 V. fuegiana  = Niesslia fuegiana, Niessliaceae
 V. gaultheriae  = Gibbera gaultheriae
 V. genistae  = Keissleriella genistae, Lentitheciaceae
 V. glomerata  = Coleroa circinans
 V. glomerata var. disseminata  = Coleroa circinans
 V. grossulariae  = Antennularia grossulariae, Metacapnodiaceae
 V. hanliniana  = Tyrannosorus hanlinianus, Dothideomycetes
 V. himalayensis  = Coleroa himalayensis
 V. hystrioides  = Tyrannosorus hystrioides, Dothideomycetes
 V. ilicifolia  = Niesslia ilicifolia, Niessliaceae
 V. ilicifolia' var. breviseta  = Niesslia ilicifolia, Niessliaceae
 V. inaequalis var. cinerascens  = Venturia inaequalis V. iridicola  = Niesslia iridicola, Niessliaceae
 V. islandica  = Pseudomassaria islandica, Pseudomassariaceae
 V. johnstonii  = Venturia maculiformis V. kalmiae  = Gibbera kalmiae) V. kunzei var. ramicola  = Venturia kunzei V. lanea  = Niesslia lanea, Niessliaceae
 V. longisetosa  = Epipolaeum longisetosum, Pseudoperisporiaceae
 V. macrotricha  = Herpotrichia macrotricha, Melanommataceae
 V. maculosa  = Antennularia maculosa, Metacapnodiaceae
 V. maculosa  = Venturia macularis V. microspora  = Niesslia microspora); Niessliaceae
 V. microspora  = Venturia minuta
 V. myrtilli  = Gibbera myrtilli
 V. niesslii  = Gibbera niesslii
 V. niesslii * nigella  = Gibbera niesslii
 V. niesslii subsp. nigella  = Gibbera niesslii
 V. nigella  = Gibbera niesslii
 V. nobilis  = Niesslia nobilis, Niessliaceae
 V. occidentalis  = Nematostoma occidentale, Pseudoperisporiaceae
 V. oreophila  = Wentiomyces oreophilus, Pseudoperisporiaceae
 V. orni  = Fraxinicola orni
 V. oxydendri  = Pseudomassaria oxydendri, Pseudomassariaceae
 V. petasitis  = Epipolaeum petasitis, Pseudoperisporiaceae
 V. populi-albae  = Venturia tremulae
 V. pulchella  = Gibbera pulchella
 V. puyae  = Niesslia puyae, Niessliaceae
 V. rhododendri  = Coleroa rhododendri
 V. rosae  = Gibbera rosae
 V. sabalicola  = Niesslia sabalicola, Niessliaceae
 V. sacchari  = Dimeriella sacchari, Parodiopsidaceae
 V. secedens  = Niesslia secedens, Niessliaceae
 V. sequoiae  = Acanthostigma sequoiae, Tubeufiaceae
 V. spegazziniana  = Niesslia spegazziniana, Niessliaceae
 V. speschnewii  = Coleroa venturioides
 V. sphaerelloidea  = Phomatosporopsis sphaerelloidea, Phomatosporaceae
 V. sporoboli  = Coleroa sporoboli
 V. straussii  = Metacapnodium ericophilum, Metacapnodiaceae
 V. tarda  = Iodosphaeria tarda, Iodosphaeriaceae
 V. tirolensis  = Pseudomassaria islandica, Pseudomassariaceae
 V. tremulae var. grandidentatae  = Venturia tremulae
 V. tremulae var. populi-albae  = Venturia tremulae
 V. turfosorum  = Epibryon turfosorum, Epibryaceae
 V. viennotii var. levispora  = Venturia viennotii

Genomes
The complete genome sequence of Venturia effusa, the first complete genome sequence of any species in the genus, was reported in 2019.

References

Venturiaceae
Fungal plant pathogens and diseases
Dothideomycetes genera
Taxa named by Pier Andrea Saccardo